Isyangulovo (İśänğol) is a rural locality (a selo) and the administrative center of Zianchurinsky District in the Republic of Bashkortostan, Russia. As of the 2010 Census, its population was 7,418.

The head of Isyangulovo village is Timur Sabirov.

References

Notes

Sources

Rural localities in Zianchurinsky District